Llanolebias stellifer is a species of killifish in the family Rivulidae. It is endemic to the Llanos, a part of the Orinoco basin in Venezuela, where it lives in shallow temporary waters (like ponds) in forests. It is the only known member of its genus, but it was formerly included in Rachovia.

References

Rivulidae
Monotypic fish genera
Freshwater fish of South America
Endemic fauna of Venezuela
Fish described in 1973